The Blue Diner is a 2001 romantic comedy film directed and written by Jan Egleson. The producer Natatcha Estébanez also co-wrote and story and screenplay. Director Jan Egleson used excess film stock from the production of James Cameron's Titanic (1997). The movie was filmed in Boston, Massachusetts, USA.

Premise
During a late night argument with her mother, Elena loses her ability to speak Spanish. This is caused by overwhelming stress. Elena's inability to reconcile with her mother. Her father has been gone since she was a very young child, and to top that off, now she feel caught between two men, a Latin artist named Tito, who has no Green Card, and her Irish-American boss, Brian. Elena turns to the Cuban proprietor of the Blue Diner for help.

Cast
Míriam Colón  as Meche (as Miriam Colón)
Lisa Vidal  as Elena
Jose Yenque  as Tito
William Marquez  as Papo
Virginia Rambal  as Vika
Jack Mulcahy  as Brian
Jaime Tirelli  as Héctor
Fidel Vicioso  as Patricio
Edouard DeSoto  as Singer in Club
Gustave Johnson  as Museum security guard
Teresa Yenque  as Dog casket shopper
René Sánchez  as Don Benito
Chuck Brinig  as Theo
Ken Cheeseman  as Banker
Lonnie Farmer  as Lawyer
Gamalier Gonzalez as the cleaning man
Peter Kovner as Museum Director

Awards
In 2002 won the Outstanding Independent Motion Picture at the ALMA Awards. It tied with No Turning Back (film) for the honor.

External links
 

2001 films
American comedy films
2001 comedy films
2000s English-language films
2000s American films